Cladotricha is a genus of tephritid  or fruit flies in the family Tephritidae.  It is considered a junior homonym to Heringomyia.

References

Tephritinae